The Seugne is an  long river in the Charente-Maritime département, in western France, left tributary of the Charente. It flows generally north-northwest.

Communes it runs through
(ordered from source to mouth)
Montlieu-la-Garde, Pouillac, Chepniers, Sainte-Colombe, Polignac, Chatenet, Le Pin, Mérignac, Sousmoulins, Pommiers-Moulons, Vibrac, Chaunac, Léoville, Fontaines-d'Ozillac, Saint-Médard, Champagnac, Jonzac, Saint-Germain-de-Lusignan, Lussac, Clion, Saint-Georges-Antignac, Mosnac, Fléac-sur-Seugne, Belluire, Pons, Bougneau, Saint-Léger, Colombiers, Montils, La Jard, Berneuil, Les Gonds, Courcoury,

References

Rivers of France
Rivers of Nouvelle-Aquitaine
Rivers of Charente-Maritime